Ooh... You Are Awful is a 1972 British comedy film directed by Cliff Owen. It is a feature-length adaptation of The Dick Emery Show. It starred Dick Emery, Derren Nesbitt, Ronald Fraser and Cheryl Kennedy. Its alternative title on its North American release was Get Charlie Tully.

It was Emery's sole starring vehicle.

Before his death, Reggie Campbell Peek deposited a stolen £500,000 into a Swiss bank account. But Peek left a record of the account number: the digits tattooed on the bottoms of four young women, none of whom knows the value of her asset. His friend and partner-in-crime Charlie Tully, using his talent as a "master of disguise", sets out to locate those women and gain sight of the digits. Meanwhile, Tully is being watched by other - more dangerous - criminals.

Plot summary
Conmen Charlie Tully and Reggie Peek have successfully conned a couple of Italian men, and are making an easy escape with £500,000. Flushed with success, Tully is unable to resist running a "quick and easy" minor con on a passing American tourist. But "quick and easy" unexpectedly goes awry, and Tully is arrested. While Tully is imprisoned, Peek manages to escape and deposit the £500,000 in a Swiss bank account. Eventually, when Tully is finally released, he is met by Peek, intending to give him the bank account number. But Peek has been having an affair with the sister of London crime lord Sid Sabbath, and his reunion with Tully is cut short when Peek is murdered, on the orders of Sabbath.

Peek has left a record of the bank account number, but in an unusual way. Befitting his reputation as a womaniser, the digits are tattooed on the bottoms of four young women. Tully adopts a range of disguises, to track down each woman in turn to see her naked bottom. Meanwhile, Tully's antics are being tracked by other - more dangerous - criminals: from London and Rome...

The first woman Tully finds is a British Rail announcer, who disrobes inside a photo booth at Waterloo station.

The second is a bride on her wedding day, who is exposed in front of her guests.

The third is the daughter of a peer, who Tully spies through her bedroom window.

Fourth and last is a policewoman at a police training school. Tully enters the school, dragged up as a trainee WPC. After spying on a multitude of nubile young recruits, he discovers the digits during a physical training session.

Throughout, Tully is confronted by members of Sid Sabbath's gang, with orders to kill - only for them to mysteriously die themselves. Tully thinks he is "lucky", while Sabbath thinks Tully is perhaps a one-man army. But neither realise Tully is being secretly guarded by Italian gangsters. It transpires the two Italian men, conned at the start of the film, had Mafia connections - and a "Godfather" has ordered Tully be kept safe until he can be brought to Rome...

Cast 
 Dick Emery ....  Charlie Tully
 Derren Nesbitt ....  Sid Sabbath
 Ronald Fraser ....  Reggie Campbell Peek
 Pat Coombs ....  Libby Niven
 William Franklyn ....  Arnold Van Cleef
 Cheryl Kennedy ....  Jo Mason
 Norman Bird ....  Warder Burke
 Roland Curram ....  Vivian
 Liza Goddard ....  Liza Missenden Green
 Ambrosine Phillpotts ....  Lady Missenden Green
 Brian Oulton ....  Funeral Director
 David Healy  ...  Tourist (as Dave Healey)
 Steve Plytas	...	Signor Vittorio Ferruchi
 Louis Negin	 ...	Emilio Ferruchi
 Neil Wilson	 ...	Attendant Price
 Henry Gilbert	 ...	Don Luigi
 Anthony Stamboulieh ...	Dino (as Antony Stamboulieh)
 Guido Adorni	 ...	Carlo
 Stefan Gryff	 ...	Capo Mafioso
 Louis Mansi	 ...	Mancini
 Frank Coda	 ...	Mafioso (as Frank Codo)
 Sheila Keith	 ...	Lady Magistrate
 Tucker McGuire	 ...	American Woman
 Phil Brown	 ...	American Man
 Joan Ingram	 ...	Woman in Art Gallery
 Julie Crosthwaite ...	Patsy
 Anna Gilchrist	  ...	Jane
 Margaret Courtenay ...	W.P.O.
 Dinny Powell	 ...	Arthur (as Dinnie Powell)
 Larry Taylor	 ...	Hood

Production
The National Film Finance Corporation invested £62,000 in the film. It was the first investment from the NFFC following the decision of the British government to pull funding from that organisation. They subsequently sought finance from a consortium of merchant banks, and decided to only make "safe" films. Ooh... You Are Awful was the first of these.

Reception
The Observer called it "the best British comedy in many years."

References

External links
 

1972 films
British independent films
1972 comedy films
Films based on television series
Films directed by Cliff Owen
Films scored by Christopher Gunning
British Lion Films films
Films set in London
1970s English-language films
1970s British films